Social anarchism, also known as left-wing anarchism or socialist anarchism, is the branch of anarchism that sees liberty and social equality as interrelated. 

It advocates for a social revolution to remove oppressive forms of hierarchy, such as capitalism and the state. In their place, social anarchists encourage social collaboration through mutual aid and envision non-hierarchical forms of social organization, such as voluntary associations.

Identified with the socialist tradition of Pierre-Joseph Proudhon, Mikhail Bakunin and Peter Kropotkin, social anarchism is often contrasted with individualist anarchism, due to the latter's criticism of socialism.

Political principles
Social anarchism is opposed to all forms of social and political power, hierarchy and oppression, including (but not limited to) the State and capitalism. Social anarchism therefore sees liberty as interconnected with social equality, and considers the maximization of one to be necessary for the maximization of the other.

Social anarchism envisions the overthrow of capitalism and the state in a social revolution, which would establish a federal society of voluntary associations and local communities, based on a network of mutual aid. 

The key principles that form the core of social anarchism include anti-capitalism, anti-statism and prefigurative politics.

Anti-capitalism
As an anti-capitalist ideology, social anarchism is opposed to the dominant expressions of capitalism, including the expansion of transnational corporation through globalization. It comprises one of the main forms of socialism, alongside utopian socialism, democratic socialism and authoritarian socialism. Social anarchism rejects private property, particularly private ownership of the means of production, as the principle source of social inequality.

While social anarchism has rejected the statism of Orthodox Marxism, it has also drawn from Marxist critiques of capitalism, particularly Marx's theory of alienation. Social anarchists have also been reluctant to adopt the Marxist centring of the proletariat as revolutionary agents, instead identifying the revolutionary potential of the socially excluded segments of society.

Anti-statism
As an anti-statist ideology, social anarchism opposes the concentration of power in the form of a State. To social anarchists, the state is a type of coercive hierarchy designed to enforce private property and to limit individual self-development. Social anarchists reject both centralised and limited forms of government, instead upholding social collaboration as a means to achieve a spontaneous order, without any social contract supplanting social relations.

In the place of a state structure, social anarchists desire anarchy, which can be defined as a society without government. Social anarchists oppose the use of a state structure to achieve their goals of a stateless and classless society, as they consider statism to be an inherently corrupting influence. They thus have criticised the Marxist conception of the "dictatorship of the proletariat", which they consider to be elitist, and have rejected the possibility of a "withering away of the state".

However, some social anarchists such as Noam Chomsky sometimes hold state hierarchy to be preferable to economic hierarchy, and thus lend their support to welfare state programs like universal health care that can improve people's material conditions.

Self-organization
Social anarchism promotes self-organization and the cultivation of a participatory culture, encouraging individuals to "do things for themselves". Social anarchism upholds direct action as a means for people to themselves resist oppression, without subordinating their own agency to democratic representatives or revolutionary vanguards. Social anarchists thus reject the political party model of organization, instead preferring forms of flat organization without any fixed leadership.

Schools of thought

Characterised by its loose definition and ideological diversity, social anarchism has lent itself to syncretism, both drawing from and influencing other ideological critiques of oppression, and giving way to a number of different anarchist schools of thought.

Over time, the question of the economic makeup of a future anarchist society drove the development of social anarchist thought. The first school of social anarchism was formulated by Pierre-Joseph Proudhon, whose theory of mutualism retained a form of private property, advocating for enterprises to be self-managed by worker cooperatives, which would compensate its workers in labour vouchers issued by "people's banks". This was later supplanted by Mikhail Bakunin's collectivist anarchism, which advocated for the collective ownership of all property, but retained a form of individual compensation. This finally led to the development of anarcho-communism by Peter Kropotkin, who considered that resources should be freely distributed "from each according to their ability, to each according to their needs", without money or wages. Social anarchists also adopted the strategy of syndicalism, which saw trade unions as the basis for a new socialist economy, with anarcho-syndicalism growing to its greatest influence during the Spanish Revolution of 1936.

The main division within social anarchism is over the means for achieving anarchy, with philosophical anarchists advocating for peaceful persuasion, while insurrectionary anarchists advocated for "propaganda of the deed". The former have upheld an anarchist form of education, free from coercion and dogmatism, in order to establish a self-governing society. The latter have participated in rebellions in which they expropriated and collectivised property, and replaced the state with a network of autonomous and federally-linked communes. The aim was to build a socialist society, without using the state, from the bottom-up.

Principles of social anarchism, such as decentralisation, anti-authoritarianism and mutual aid, later held a key influence on the new social movements of the late-20th century. It was particularly influential within the New Left and green politics, with the green anarchist tendency of social ecology drawing directly from social anarchism. Social anarchist strategies of direct action and spontaneity also formed the foundation of the black bloc tactic, which has become a staple of contemporary anarchism.

In the contemporary era, anarcho-communism and anarcho-syndicalism are the dominant tendencies of social anarchism.

Distinction from individualism

Social anarchism is commonly distinguished from individualist anarchism, the latter of which favours individual sovereignty and property, and can even oppose all forms of social organization altogether. Individualism was heavily criticised by classical social anarchists, such as Bakunin and Kropotkin, who held that the liberty of a few individuals was potentially harmful to the equality of all mankind. However, this distinction is also contested, as anarchism itself is often seen as a synthesis of liberal individualism and social egalitarianism. Some social anarchists have argued that the divisions between them and the individualists can be overcome, by emphasising their shared commitment to anti-capitalism and anti-authoritarianism. But others draw the line at forms of individualism that uphold hierarchical power relations.

In his 1995 book, Social Anarchism or Lifestyle Anarchism, Murray Bookchin defined social anarchism in contrast to what he called "lifestyle anarchism", represented in the individualist anarchism of Max Stirner, Emma Goldman and John Zerzan. According to Bookchin, it was impossible for the two tendencies to coexist, claiming there to be an "unbridgeable chasm" that separated them from each other. Bookchin held social anarchism to be the only genuine form of anarchism, considering individualism to be inherently oppressive. However, Bookchin's analysis has been criticised as "reductive" and "undialectical", due to his failure to recognise the many connections and interrelations between the two tendencies.

Although sometimes considered a form of individualist anarchism, anarcho-capitalism is typically rejected as a legitimate anarchist school of thought by social anarchists, who uphold anti-capitalism as a central principle. In contrast, social anarchists accept American individualist anarchists like Benjamin Tucker and Lysander Spooner as genuine, due in part to their opposition to capitalism. In turn, modern anti-capitalist individualists like Kevin Carson have drawn inspiration from social anarchism, while retaining their pro-market views.

Criticism
The social anarchist model for building socialism from the bottom-up was opposed by Marxists, who instead advocated for a "dictatorship of the proletariat". Marxists considered social anarchism to be an ideology of the petite bourgeoisie and the lumpenproletariat, criticising it particularly for its anti-statism, which it considered to be a politically sectarian impulse.

Post-structuralists have criticised social anarchism for its narrow analysis of power. To the post-structuralist Todd May, power is irreducible and dispersed, arising from many different places. Whereas social anarchists such as Mikhail Bakunin focus on the concentration of power within the hands of the ruling class or the bourgeoisie, which they hold to be the principle source of social issues. Critical theorists have also criticised the social anarchist understanding of power for focusing too much on the state, without considering power dynamics inherent to racism, sexism and even some interpersonal relationships.

See also 
 Social anarchists (category)

References

Bibliography

Further reading

External links 

 

 
Anarchist schools of thought
Types of socialism